The chairman of the Joint Chiefs of Staff (CJCS) is the presiding officer of the United States Joint Chiefs of Staff  (JCS). The chairman is the highest-ranking and most senior military officer in the United States Armed Forces and the principal military advisor to the president, the National Security Council, the Homeland Security Council, and the secretary of defense. While the chairman of the Joint Chiefs of Staff outranks all other commissioned officers, the chairman is prohibited by law from having operational command authority over the armed forces; however, the chairman assists the president and the secretary of defense in exercising their command functions.

The chairman convenes the meetings and coordinates the efforts of the Joint Chiefs, an advisory body within the Department of Defense comprising the chairman, the vice chairman of the Joint Chiefs of Staff, the chief of staff of the Army, the commandant of the Marine Corps, the chief of naval operations, the chief of staff of the Air Force, the chief of space operations, and the chief of the National Guard Bureau. The post of a statutory and permanent Joint Chiefs of Staff chair was created by the 1949 amendments to the National Security Act of 1947. The 1986 Goldwater–Nichols Act elevated the chairman from the first among equals to becoming the "principal military advisor" to the president and the secretary of defense.

The Joint Staff, managed by the director of the Joint Staff and consisting of military personnel from all the services, assists the chairman in fulfilling his duties to the president and secretary of defense, and functions as a conduit and collector of information between the chairman and the combatant commanders. The National Military Command Center (NMCC) is part of the Joint Staff operations directorate (J-3).

Although the office of Chairman of the Joint Chiefs of Staff is considered very important and highly prestigious, neither the chairman, the vice chairman, nor the Joint Chiefs of Staff as a body has any command authority over combatant forces. The Goldwater–Nichols Act places the operational chain of command from the president to the secretary of defense directly to the commanders of the unified combatant commands. However the service chiefs do have authority over personnel assignments and oversight over resources and personnel allocated to the combatant commands within their respective services (derived from the service secretaries).

The chairman may also transmit communications to the combatant commanders from the president and secretary of defense as well as allocate additional funding to the combatant commanders if necessary. The chairman also performs all other functions prescribed under  or allocates those duties and responsibilities to other officers in the joint staff.

Organization and assistants

The principal deputy to the chairman is the vice chairman of the Joint Chiefs of Staff (VCJCS), another four-star general or admiral, who among many duties chairs the Joint Requirements Oversight Council (JROC).

The chairman of the Joint Chiefs of Staff is assisted by the Joint Staff, led by the director of the Joint Staff, a three-star general or admiral. The Joint Staff is an organization composed of approximately equal numbers of officers contributed by the Army, Navy, Marine Corps, Air Force, and Space Force who have been assigned to assist the chairman with the unified strategic direction, operation, and integration of the combatant land, naval, air, and space forces. The National Military Command Center (NMCC) is part of the Joint Staff operations directorate (J-3).

The chairman of the Joint Chiefs of Staff is also advised on enlisted personnel matters by the senior enlisted advisor to the chairman, who serves as a communication conduit between the chairman and the senior enlisted advisors (command sergeants major, command master chief petty officers, and command chief master sergeants) of the combatant commands.

Precursor
Fleet Admiral William D. Leahy, USN, served as the chief of staff to the commander in chief of the Army and Navy from 20 July 1942 to 21 March 1949. He presided over meetings of what was called the Joint Chiefs of Staff, and Leahy's office was the precursor to the post of Chairman of the Joint Chiefs of Staff, created in 1949.

Appointment and rank

The chairman is nominated by the president for appointment from any of the regular components of the armed forces, and must be confirmed via majority vote by the Senate. The chairman and vice chairman may not be members of the same armed force service branch. However, the president may waive that restriction for a limited period of time in order to provide for the orderly transition of officers appointed to serve in those positions. The chairman serves a single four-year term of office at the pleasure of the president, with reappointment to additional terms only possible during times of war or national emergency. Historically, the chairman served two two-year terms, until the National Defense Authorization Act for Fiscal Year 2017 amended the chairman's term of office to a single four-year term. By statute, the chairman is appointed as a four-star general or admiral while holding office and assumes office on 1 October of odd-numbered years.

Although the first chairman of the Joint Chiefs of Staff, Omar Bradley, was eventually awarded a fifth star, the CJCS does not receive one by right, and Bradley's award was so that his subordinate, General of the Army Douglas MacArthur, would not outrank him. In the 1990s, there were proposals in Department of Defense academic circles to bestow on the office of Chairman of the Joint Chiefs of Staff a five-star rank.

Previously during the presidency of Harry S. Truman and Dwight D. Eisenhower, the chairman of the Joint Chiefs of Staff position was rotated in accordance with the incumbent chairman's armed force service branch. In this rotation, the incoming chairman would be from a different service branch. For example, in 1957, following the retirement of Admiral Arthur W. Radford as Chairman of the Joint Chiefs of Staff, President Eisenhower nominated United States Air Force general Nathan F. Twining as Radford's successor. When General Twining retired, Eisenhower nominated Army general Lyman Lemnitzer to succeed Twining as 

However, in October 1962, when President Kennedy appointed Army general Maxwell Taylor as General Lemnitzer's successor, Kennedy eventually broke the traditional rotation for the chairman of the Joint Chiefs of Staff position between the Air Force, Navy, Marines, and Army. Kennedy replaced a chairman who was from the Army with a general who was also from the Army. At that time, Kennedy should have appointed either Air Force chief of staff General Curtis E. LeMay, Chief of Naval Operations Admiral George Whelan Anderson Jr., or Commandant of the Marine Corps General David M. Shoup to succeed General Lemnitzer as the fifth chairman of the Joint Chiefs of Staff. Since that, the traditional rotation was abolished.

The chairman of the Joint Chiefs of Staff was an Army general for three consecutive terms from 1960 to 1970: Army general Lyman Lemnitzer served as chairman from 1960 until 1962. Lemnitzer was replaced by Army general Maxwell Taylor, who served from 1962 until 1964. Taylor was replaced by Army general Earle Wheeler, who served from 1964 until 1970. The chairman of the Joint Chiefs of Staff was also an Army general for three consecutive terms from 1989 to 2001: Army general Colin Powell served as chairman from 1989 until 1993 and was succeeded by Army general John Shalikashvilli, who served from 1993 until 1997. When General Shalikashvilli retired in 1997, he was also succeeded by Army general Hugh Shelton, who served from 1997 until 2001. With Army general Mark Milley assuming the position of chairman of the Joint Chiefs of Staff in October 2019, exactly half of the chairmen—10 out of 20—have been Army generals.

According to the Monthly Rates of Basic Pay (Commissioned Officer) - effective January 1, 2020 [actually 2022], basic pay is limited to the rate of basic pay for level II of the Executive Schedule in effect during calendar year 2022, which is $16,974.90 per month for officers at pay grades O-7 through O-10.  This includes officers serving as Chairman or Vice Chairman of the Joint Chiefs of Staff, Chief of Staff of the Army, Chief of Naval Operations, Chief of Staff of the Air Force, Commandant of the Marine Corps, Chief of Space Operations, Commandant of the Coast Guard, Chief of the National Guard Bureau, or Commander of a unified or specified combatant command.

List of chairmen

Chief of Staff to the Commander in Chief (historical predecessor office)

Chairmen of the Joint Chiefs of Staff

Chairmen of the Joint Chiefs of Staff by branches of service within the Department of Defense
 Army: 10
 Navy: 4
 Air Force: 4
 Marine Corps: 2
 Space Force: 0

Timeline

See also
 Chief of Defence
 Chief of the Defence Force
 Chief of the Defence Staff
 Chief of the General Staff
 National Command Authority (United States)
 National Military Strategy (United States)
 Single Integrated Operational Plan
 Unified Command Plan

References

Citations

General sources

External links

 

USA
Joint Chiefs of Staff